Strider II (released in North America under the title of Journey from Darkness: Strider Returns), is a side-scrolling platform game published by U.S. Gold (under license from Capcom USA) and originally released for various computer platforms in 1990. It is a European-developed sequel to Capcom's arcade game Strider, which U.S. Gold previously ported to home computers in Europe.

Capcom later developed their own sequel in 1999, titled Strider 2 for the arcades and PlayStation, which ignores U.S. Gold's version of Strider II.

Computer versions
Strider II was released for the Commodore Amiga, Atari ST, Commodore 64, Amstrad CPC and ZX Spectrum. Strider II was later remade for the Sega Genesis and Master System in 1992.

In the computer versions of Strider II the objective of the game is to rescue the Princess of Planet Magenta from a terrorist group that is keeping her captive. The controls in the computer version are similar to U.S. Gold's home computer ports of the original Strider, although the character cannot slide nor climb ceilings like in the original game. However, he can still climb walls, as well as ropes. In addition to his cypher, he can also use a rifle whenever he is standing still. If the player character has collected enough energy icons throughout each stage, he will transform into a wheeled robot when confronting the boss at the end of each stage. As a robot, Strider can shoot lasers, but cannot jump nor crouch. His robot form has a separate health gauge from his regular health gauge as a human. When his robot gauge runs out, he will transform back to a human. The game consists of five stages.

Console versions
Two years after the release of the computer versions, U.S. Gold and Tiertex ported Strider II to the Sega Genesis/Mega Drive. In addition to its European release, Strider II was also released for the American Sega Genesis under the title of Journey from Darkness: Strider Returns. The Genesis version of Strider Returns differs from the previous computer version in several ways. While the plot is the same, the antagonist is now the Grandmaster (Meio) from the original Strider (who is referred in the game's manual as the "Evil Master"). Although the main character uses the same sprite as in the Genesis version of the original Strider, this Strider is addressed in the manual as "Hinjo" (instead of "Hiryu", the actual code name of the original protagonist).

The player controls Hinjo similarly to Hiryu in the first Genesis game (with the ability to slide and move under ceilings retained). Instead of a gun like in the home computer versions, Hinjo throws shurikens but only if he collects them first. Instead of transforming into a robot when he confronts a boss, Hinjo collects orbs throughout each stage instead. These orbs will surround Hinjo and protect him when he faces the stage's boss. The player can choose between Hiryu's original cypher from the first game or a new "sweeping" cypher.

Strider II was also released for the 8-bit Master System in Europe. This version features gameplay similar to its Genesis counterpart. Unlike the Genesis version, the Strider's supply of shurikens are unlimited, but he can only throw two on-screen at the same time. Due to the fewer buttons of the Master System's controller, shurikens are thrown while the player is standing still. This version was converted to the Game Gear and released in North America as Strider Returns. An Atari Lynx version was being developed and listed as 50% complete, but it was never released.

Reception
Matt Bielby of Your Sinclair magazine gave the game a positive review, and went so far as to claim that Capcom wanted to use the Sinclair port of this game as the basis for a coin-op sequel.

The four reviewers of Electronic Gaming Monthly gave the Genesis version a 6.75 out of 10, describing it as a decent but disappointing sequel. They praised the massive size of the game and the high amount of digitized voices, but criticized that the animation is much too choppy. Three of the four also felt that the gameplay lacked the excitement of the original Strider. They gave the Game Gear version a unanimous score of 7 out of 10, but were sharply divided in their opinions. Two of them felt it to be "surprisingly better on the Game Gear than on the Genesis", citing better playability with far less choppiness in the animation, while the other two felt it to be far worse than the Genesis version, complaining of both inferior graphics and the annoyingly long distance the player character is knocked back when hit. GamePro took the middle ground, saying the "Graphics and game play parallel the Genesis version." They praised the controls, large sprites, and detailed backgrounds, but criticized the slower pace and droning soundtrack, and concluded "Strider fans will welcome his return, but others will shrug."

In a Strider series retrospective, Ken Horowitz of Sega-16.com compared Strider Returns to "seeing a loved one revived as a mindless zombie". Travis Fahs, writing a Retro feature for IGN, commented that U.S. Gold had made multiple improvements to Strider II for its console ports, but that the core problem of dull level design remained.

References

External links

1990 video games
Amiga games
Amstrad CPC games
Atari ST games
Cancelled Atari Lynx games
Commodore 64 games
Master System games
Platform games
Video games about ninja
Game Gear games
Sega Genesis games
Strider Hiryu
U.S. Gold games
Video game sequels
ZX Spectrum games
Tiertex Design Studios games
Single-player video games
Video games developed in the United Kingdom